Dunville may refer to:

Dunville, Newfoundland and Labrador, a place in Newfoundland, Canada
Dunnville, Ontario, a place in Ontario, Canada
John Dunville, an Irish founder of Dunville & Co
John Dunville, an English Victoria Cross recipient